Euchromius zephyrus is a species of moth in the family Crambidae. It is found in Senegal, Mali, Côte d'Ivoire, Ghana and Nigeria.

The length of the forewings is 16–18 mm. The groundcolour of the forewings is creamy white, densely suffused with ochreous to dark brown scales. The hindwings are grey-brown, with a darkly bordered termen. Adults are on wing from September to the end of November, with a peak in the first two weeks of  November.

References

Moths described in 1962
Crambinae
Insects of West Africa
Moths of Africa